Flemington is the debut solo record from Bruce Springsteen's E Street Band keyboardist Danny Federici.  It was first released in 1996 on Deadeye Records, a label Federici co-owned with Franklin Jenkins and Ben Arrington of Diamondback, then in 1997 picked up by Musicmasters Records (see 1997 in music).  Federici himself produced the disc (as well as playing the accordion and all manner of keyboards), and wrote all the tracks, except one which was co-written by Tony Braunagel.

Track listing
All Songs Written By Danny Federici except where noted.
"Flemington" 3:38
"Mingle-Mangle" 2:58
"My Little Cow" 3:50
"Mr. Continental" 3:25
"Carousel Breeze" 2:35
"Egg Beater" (Tony Braunagel, Federici) 3:38
"A Doorman's Life" 4:57
"Sea Bright" 3:20
"Round & Round" 3:15
"In The Next Five Minutes" 4:44
"Pennsylvania Avenue" 5:08

Personnel
Danny Federici - keyboards, synthesizers, organ, piano, accordion
John DeFaria, Nils Lofgren - guitars
Alfredo Fettucini, Garry Tallent - bass
Joe Sublett - saxophone
Tony Branaugel - drums, percussion

Production
Arranged & Produced By Danny Federici
Engineered By Dennis Degher & Danny Federici
Mixed By Dennis Degher
Mastered By Bernie Grundman

External links
 [ "Flemington" at allmusic]

1997 debut albums